The 1898 Maryland Aggies football team represented the Maryland Agricultural College (now the University of Maryland) in the 1898 college football season. The team was led by player-coach Frank Kenly and finished with a 2–6–1 record.

Schedule

Personnel
The players of the 1898 team were:
Grant Church, end
Hiram Collins, end
English Eyster, end
Frank Hines, end
F. H. Peters, end
Jim Bradley, tackle
Ellis Caldwell, tackle
Dorsey Cashell, tackle
Harry Kefauver, tackle
Fred Shamberger, tackle
Jim Blandford, guard
Turford Noble, guard
Tom Symons, guard
Jim Shipley, center
Andy Grayson, quarterback
Frank Kenly, quarterback
Ellis Caldwell, halfback
Joe Devon, halfback
Tom Massey, halfback
Jim Wilson, halfback
Samuel Cooke, fullback and captain-coach

Manager:
Robert McCandish

References

Maryland
Maryland Terrapins football seasons
Maryland Aggies football